Chimo may refer to:

 Chimo (greeting), a greeting from the Inuktitut language of northern Canada, also used in some parts of Southern Ontario and Western Canada
 Chimo, the nickname, cheer and mascot of the Canadian Military Engineers
 the 223 Royal Canadian Sea Cadets Corps CHIMO, founded in 1970 at Longueuil, Quebec (renamed 223 RCSCC LONGUEUIL in the mid 1980s)
 Chimo, an active softball league in Brossard, Quebec
 Chimo (orca), the only white killer whale displayed in captivity, at Sealand of the Pacific from 1970 to 1972
 Chimo!, 1960s Canadian rock band
 Chimo Bayo, 1990s Spanish dance act
 Chimo, a very strong tobacco paste taken orally, principally in Venezuela and adjacent countries
 Chimo (pseudonym), author of Lila Says (novel), and its protagonist
 Chimo, a march played during Moros y Cristianos parades in Spain
 Chimo, a Canadian brand of bicycle manufactured in Canada by Interex Industries
 USS Chimo (ACM-1) the lead ship of her class of minelayers in the United States Navy during World War II